Talmadge Hill station is a commuter rail station on the New Canaan Branch of the Metro-North Railroad New Haven Line, located just south of the Merritt Parkway in New Canaan, Connecticut.

Station layout
The station has one four-car-long high-level side platform to the west of the single track.

The Talmadge Hill station also has a central shelter typical of other small stations on the New Haven Line, as well as a pair of smaller shelters on either end of the platform. There are two parking lots to the west of the station and to the east there are six lots. The two lots furthest to the east are for daily parking, while the remaining are for monthly commuters with New Canaan resident permits. The station is owned by the Connecticut Department of Transportation (ConnDOT) and operated by the Town of New Canaan. The 366-space parking lot, except for 18 spaces on the east side of the tracks, is operated by the town as well. Metro-North is responsible for trash cleanup and platform lighting.

References

External links

 Station from Talmadge Hill Road from Google Maps Street View
 http://www.ct.gov/dot/lib/dot/documents/dpt/1_Station_Inspection_Summary_Report.pdf

Metro-North Railroad stations in Connecticut
Stations along New York, New Haven and Hartford Railroad lines
Railroad stations in Fairfield County, Connecticut
Buildings and structures in New Canaan, Connecticut
Railway stations opened in 1868
1868 establishments in Connecticut